Craig Biddiscombe (born 21 September 1976) is a former Australian rules footballer who played with Geelong and Richmond in the Australian Football League (AFL).

Biddiscombe came to Geelong from Traralgon and was drafted from the Gippsland Power. He went at pick 59 in the 1993 National Draft and would be used by Geelong as a midfielder.

In 1995, his debut season, Biddiscombe made two appearances, in rounds 20 and 21, but he didn't take part in Geelong's finals campaign. The following year he earned a Rising Star nomination for his performance against Fitzroy at Western Oval, in what was his seventh league game. He was never able to cement his spot in the Geelong side and after the 1998 AFL season was traded to Richmond. In order to secure his services, Richmond gave Geelong pick eight in the 1998 National Draft, which was on-traded to the Sydney Swans, who used it to select Jude Bolton.

His first season at Richmond was ruined by hamstring injuries and he managed just four senior appearances. In 2000 however he played 19 of a possible 22 games, as a half-back, and won Richmond's "Best Clubman" award. He appeared in the first 10 rounds of the 2001 season but then injured his knee and didn't feature again for the rest of the year. The rest of his time with Richmond was spent mostly in the reserves and he was delisted at the end of 2003.

In 2004 and 2005, Biddiscombe played for North Ballarat. He then joined South Barwon in 2006 and was a member of their premiership team that year, and again in 2007.

Biddiscombe is also a cricketer, he has played for the Barwon Heads cricket club in the Bellarine Peninsula cricket association since 1996. During his time he has won 5 A grade premierships (2005/2006, 2007-2008, 2008–2009, 2010-2011 and most recently 2013/14). Biddiscombes natural leadership and professionalism is a big part of the success behind the club in recent years. Biddiscombe also took on the club coach role in the 2013/14 season. He played a season with St Josephs cricket club in 2017/18, in the Geelong Cricket association and now calls North Geelong Cricket Club home and in fact was made co-coach in 2020/21. After back to back Premierships Craig has set the boys up for another season, adding in a damaging loop course of St Helens Hill that he likes to call "Bidders Loop".

He now runs and owns Elite Team Dynamics.

References

1976 births
Living people
Australian rules footballers from Victoria (Australia)
Geelong Football Club players
Richmond Football Club players
Gippsland Power players
North Ballarat Football Club players
Traralgon Football Club players
South Barwon Football Club players
People from Traralgon